The Great Adventure is an American historical anthology series that appeared on CBS for the 1963–64 television season. The initial 13 episodes were narrated by Van Heflin, with the second grouping of 13 episodes narrated by Russell Johnson. The series, which featured theme music by Richard Rodgers, presented a weekly one-hour dramatization of the lives of famous Americans and important events in American history.

Synopsis 
The series lasted for only 26 episodes, and showed, among others, stories on the Confederate submarine, the Hunley; the life of Harriet Tubman; the Battles of Lexington and Concord; the trial and hanging of Nathan Hale; the life of "Boss" Tweed; the death of Sitting Bull; the siege of Boonesborough; the capture of Jefferson Davis; the life and death of Wild Bill Hickok; and the Battle of New Orleans.

Notable guest stars 
Among those who appeared in the series were:

Claude Akins
Whit Bissell
Lloyd Bridges
Howard Caine
Carroll O'Connor
Michael Constantine
Jackie Cooper
Joseph Cotten
Robert Culp
Bob Cummings
Ossie Davis
Ruby Dee
John Dehner
Ivan Dixon
Andrew Duggan
Bernard Fox
Peter Graves
Ron Howard
Russell Johnson
Victor Jory
Jack Klugman
James MacArthur
Lee Marvin
David McCallum
Peggy McCay
Ricardo Montalbán
Channing Pollock
Denver Pyle
Wayne Rogers
Marion Ross
Rip Torn
Jack Warden
H. M. Wynant

Historical background

Episodes

References

External links 

Theme music
The Great Adventure at CVTA with episode list

1963 American television series debuts
1964 American television series endings
1960s American anthology television series
CBS original programming
Black-and-white American television shows
American historical television series
Television series by CBS Studios
English-language television shows